Alex Pontons Paz (born 26 November 1994) is a Bolivian footballer who plays for Oriente Petrolero in the Liga de Futbol Profesional Boliviano out loan from Sampdoria.

Club career
A product of the Milan youth academy, Paz joined Nocerina on a season long loan on 25 July 2013 along with fellow Edmund Hottor. He made his debut for the club in a Coppa Italia match against Pordenone, where he started the match.

References

External links

1994 births
Living people
Sportspeople from Santa Cruz de la Sierra
Association football forwards
Bolivian footballers
A.C. Milan players
A.S.G. Nocerina players
S.S. Teramo Calcio players
Universitario de Sucre footballers
Bolivian expatriate footballers
Expatriate footballers in Italy
Bolivian expatriate sportspeople in Italy